The 1911–12 season was Stoke's third season in the Southern Football League.

Stoke now having left the Birmingham & District League to concentrate on the Southern League Division One, which at the time was only second to the Football League. Stoke neither struggled or impressed and they finished in 10th position with 36 points.

Season review

League
After leaving the Birmingham & District League Stoke concentrated on the Southern League Division One which was now a much more tougher league. The squad was strengthened by Alfred Barker who brought in a new half back line with the arrival of Jimmy McGillvray, Jock Grieve and George Smart. Stoke made a useful start to the season and held a position in the top half of the table, but four defeats either side of Christmas saw them plunge into the bottom five and prospects for the new year did not look too promising. Yet, things did manage to improve on the pitch. Goalkeeper Richard Herron and right-half Sam Baddeley were restored to the first team and forwards John Lenaghan and Tom Revill joined to add some much needed punch up front. Stoke sold both Arthur Cartlidge and Jock Grieve to South Shields for a decent price while Jack Peart joined Newcastle United for £600. Stoke ended the season with a 7–0 victory over Millwall Athletic.

Stoke had some good crowds at home in 1911–12 with 18,000 present to see the opening match against Brighton & Hove Albion. However Stoke fans developed a reputation following a near riot in December 1911 home defeat to Queens Park Rangers. The referee had no choice but to abandon the match with just two minutes remaining, although the league ordered the result to stand. Stoke had to pay £4,000 for the installation of fences around the ground which came as a bitter blow to the club's finances following the debacle in 1908.

FA Cup
Stoke made an early exit to Walsall in the fifth qualifying round losing 2–1 at Fellows Park.

Final league table

Results

Stoke's score comes first

Legend

Southern Football League Division One

FA Cup

Squad statistics

References

Stoke City F.C. seasons
Stoke